Yavatmal district , [jəʋət̪maːɭ] formerly known as Yeotmal, is a district of the Indian state of Maharashtra. It is located in the region of Vidarbha, in the east-central part of the state. It is Vidarbha's third-largest district by population, after Nagpur and Amravati. Yavatmal city is the administrative headquarters of the district.

History

It is believed that Yavatmal, along with the rest of the former Berar province, was part of the legendary kingdom of Vidarbha mentioned in the Mahabharata. Berar also formed part of the Mauryan Empire during the reign of Ashoka (272 to 231 BCE). Berar later came under the rule of the Satavahana dynasty ( to ), the Vakataka dynasty (3rd to 6th centuries), the Chalukya dynasty (6th to 8th centuries), the Rashtrakuta dynasty (8th to 10th centuries), the Western Chalukya (10th to 12th centuries), and finally the Yadava dynasty of Devagiri (late 12th to early 14th centuries). A period of Muslim rule began when Ala ud din Khilji, Sultan of Delhi, conquered the region in the early 14th century. The region was part of the Bahmani Sultanate, which broke away from the Delhi Sultanate in the mid-14th century. The Bahmani Sultanate broke into smaller sultanates at the end of the 15th century, and in 1572 Berar became part of the Nizam Shahi sultanate, based at Ahmednagar. The Nizam Shahis ceded Berar to the Mughal Empire in 1595. As Mughal rule started to unravel at the start of the 18th century, Asaf Jah I, Nizam of Hyderabad, seized the southern provinces of the empire (including Berar) in 1724, forming an independent state.

A detailed account of Berar was added to the Ain-i-Akbari in 1596–97, immediately after the treaty of Ahmadnagar under which the province was ceded to the Mughal Empire; this account may be regarded as a description of the province as it was administered by the Nizam Sahi and Imad Sahi kings, and probably also by the Bahamanis. The account notes that Berar was divided into thirteen sarkars or revenue districts. The Yavatmal district comprised the greater part of Akbar's sarkars of Kalam and Mahur. But some few mahals of these sarkars lay beyond the present limits of the district. The suffix mal is a corruption of mahal (pargana-town). A rough estimate makes the land revenue demand in Akbar's time for the area now occupied by the district more than ten lakhs (one million) rupees, while it is certain that collection must have fallen far short of the nominal demand.

In 1853 the district, together with the rest of Berar, came under the administration of the British East India Company. Berar was divided into East Berar and West Berar with Yavatmal district included in the former. In 1864 Yavatmal, along with some other talukas, was formed into the district initially called Southeast Berar and later renamed Wani. In 1903 Berar was leased by the Nizam of Hyderabad to the British Government of India.

Geography 

Yavatmal District is situated in the south-western part of Wardha Penganga-Wainganga basin. The geographical location of the district falls in 19.26 and 20.42 north latitudes and 77.18 to 7.9.9 in the eastern line. Amravati and Wardha districts, from east to Chandrapur district, Telangana and Nanded district are from the north whereas Parbhani and Akola districts are surrounded by west.

The district covers  (4.41 percent of the state). The district occupies the southeastern part of Berar.

Yavatmal district is in the southern mountain ranges of Berar, situated on a wide plain surrounded by hilly terrain and mountain ranges running east to west.

The two main rivers are the Penganga and Wardha. The Wardha originates in Madhya Pradesh. The Penganga river is the main tributary of the Wardha, and marks the southern boundary of the district before joining the Wardha. The Wardha's other tributaries include the Bembala and Nirguda, which flow only during the monsoon season. Other rivers include the Bembala and Nirguda rivers on the Yavatmal Plateau.

Climate 

The climate is dry and hot in summer with a moderately cold winter. The year is divided into four seasons: summer (March to May), southwest monsoon season (June to September), northern monsoon season (October to November), and winter (December to February).

Almost all of the rain falls during the southwest monsoon season. In recent years heavy rainfall has destroyed crops or left the land unsuitable for planting.

The average daily temperature in May reaches . The district temperature may fall below  due to the humidity of cool northern air.

Demographics

According to the 2011 census Yavatmal district had a population of 2,772,348, roughly equal to the nation of Jamaica or the US state of Utah.
Its population ranking was 141st in India (out of a total of 640), and 21st in the state (out of 35). Its population growth rate over the decade 2001–2011 was 12.9%. Yavatmal had a sex ratio of 947 females for every 1000 males, and a literacy rate of 80.7%. 21.58% of the population lived in urban areas. Scheduled Castes and Scheduled Tribes make up 11.85% and 18.54% of the population respectively.

Religion

Languages

At the time of the 2011 Census of India, 67.57% of the population in the district spoke Marathi, 13.29% Lambadi, 5.41% Urdu, 4.99% Hindi, 2.77% Kolami, 2.41% Gondi and 1.69% Telugu as their first language.

Marathi is the major language. Other languages spoken are Urdu, Hindi, Telugu, Banjari, Gondi, Kolami and Andh, an Indo-Aryan language spoken by 100,000 people. People here speak with the Varhadi dialect.

Divisions
Yavatmal district forms the southeast corner of Amravati Division, which corresponds to the former British Raj province of Berar. Yavatmal city is the administrative headquarters of this district.

Yavatmal district comprises sixteen tehsils: 

Arni 
Babhulgaon 
Darwha 
Digras 
Ghatanji 
Kalamb 
Mahagaon 
Maregaon 
Ner, Yavatmal
Pandharkawada (Kelapur) 
Pusad 
Ralegaon 
Umarkhed 
Wani
Yavatmal 
Zari Jamani

There are seven Maharashtra Vidhan Sabha constituencies in this district:

Digras 
Arni (ST) 
Pusad 
Ralegaon (ST) 
Umarkhed (SC)
Wani
Yavatmal

Transport
Yavatmal City and District has good connectivity of Transport to all major city in India and Maharastra i.e. Nagpur, Mumbai, Pune, Nashik, Nanded, Aurangabad, Amravati, Adilabad, Hyderabad.

National Highway 7 (NH7) passes through the district.

National Highway 361 passes through Yavatmal City and district.

Proposed National Highway from Khandwa(MP) to Karanji is passing via Paratwada, Amravati, Yavatmal. 
Yavatmal to Amravati  route needs to be buid newly via Pimpalgaon, Sawar, Dabha(pahur), Rajura, Bankhead as the existing are unnecessarily too long to travel.

Jawaharlal Darda Yavatmal Airport, Bhari, Yavatmal.

Yavatmal-Murtijapur Railway Line (Work in Progress)

Wardha-Yavatmal-Nanded Railway Line (Work in Progress)

India's first Broad Gauge Metro will run from Nagpur to Yavatmal

In future Maharashtra's  Nagpur or Chandrapur to Pune expressway if propose can be pass via Yavatmal, washim, Lonar, Paithan, Ahmednagar.

Economy
As Yavatmal is Cotton City Jowar and cotton are the main produce of the district, cotton and teakwood the chief exports. Other items exported include lime, wooden furniture and oranges. soybean crop is an important crop as major soybean plants have come up in the area.

In 2006 the Ministry of Panchayati Raj named Yavatmal one of the country's 250 most-backward districts (out of a total of 640). It is one of the twelve districts in Maharashtra currently receiving funds from the Backward Regions Grant Fund Programme (BRGF).

Mining 
The geology of the district is transitional with Deccan trap rocks (lava bed) predominating, displaying characteristic step-like hills and ridges. These have been eroded through in places, exposing older Puranic and Aryan sediments.

Forestry 
Forsts are located at Bitargaon, Tipeshwar, Tiwsala and Umbarda. Trees include teak, tendu, hirda, apta and moha, as well as bamboo. Wild-bear, deer, nilgai, sambar, hyena and peacock are among the animals found in the forests. There are wildlife sanctuaries at Tipeshwar and Painganga.Tipeshwar is in way to become Tiger Reserve in India.

Tourism 
Arni and Digras tehsils are pilgrimage locations, important for the journeys of Baba Kambalposh R.A. Shrine and Shri Ghantibaba Temple. They also have the Shri Chintamani temple of Kalamb, Ghatanji Maroti Maharaj Yatra and the Shree Datta Jayanti festival at Jambhora Mahur.

Ner tehsil have temple called Shri Fakirji Maharaj Sansthan, Dhanaj Manikwada which is Grade 'B' pilgrimage by Gramvikas Department of Maharashtra State Government.

Shree Chintamani Ganesh Temple is at Kalamb on the bank of the Chakravati.

The district has various entrenched cultures and tribal communities, including the Gond Raja, Gond Pardhan, Kolam, Aandh and Banjara. Various religious fairs take place in the district including:

 Fakirji Maharaj Fair, Dhanaj Manikwada, is a pilgrimage place for both Hindu as well as Muslim people. He was a saint lived 250–300 years back. Temple culture reflects the varkari sampraday. Trust is associated with different social activities. Devotees visit this place on Kartik and Ashadi Yatra. Kanya-bhakar mahaprasad in yatra and Saath Festival is famous in Maharashtra.
 Shree Chintamani Fair, Kalamb
 The Jambhora and Mahashiv Ratri in Wani, Pusad and Mahagaon
 Shri Rangnaath Swamy, Wani
 Amba Devi, Kelapur
 Baba Kambalposh R.A. Urs/Fair, Arni
 Maroti and Gajanan Maharaj Fair, Ghatanji
 Ghanti Baba chi Yatra, Digras
 Painganga Wildlife Sanctuary
 Ambona lake
 Sahasrakund Waterfall
 Shri Kshetra Panchmukhi Mahadev Mandir, Hardada
 Balaji Mandir, Dhanora(Sa)

There are also forest locations for tourists and hot springs at Kapeshwar on the banks of Penganga.

Notable people
Vasantrao Naik - Longest ruling CM of Maharashtra. 
Aajibai Banarase, community leader and president of Maharashtra Mandal London

References

External links

 Yavatmal district's official website

 
Districts of Maharashtra
1864 establishments in India
Amravati division
Vidarbha